Krzysztof Kucharczyk (born 7 May 1957 in Wrocław) is a Polish former sport shooter who competed in the 1988 Summer Olympics, in the 1992 Summer Olympics, in the 1996 Summer Olympics, and in the 2000 Summer Olympics.

References

1957 births
Living people
Polish male sport shooters
ISSF pistol shooters
Olympic shooters of Poland
Shooters at the 1988 Summer Olympics
Shooters at the 1992 Summer Olympics
Shooters at the 1996 Summer Olympics
Shooters at the 2000 Summer Olympics
Sportspeople from Wrocław
20th-century Polish people